Jacques Archambault (September 15, 1765 – December 31, 1851) was a farmer and political figure in Lower Canada. He represented Leinster in the Legislative Assembly of Lower Canada from 1810 to 1814.

He was born in Saint-Pierre-du-Portage, the son of Pierre Archambault and Marie-Josephte Gauthier. Archambault settled on a farm in Saint-Roch in 1783. In the same year, he married Véronique Debussat, dit Saint-Germain. In 1805, he was named a justice of the peace for Montreal district. He served as a captain in the militia during the War of 1812. Archambault also served on the school board for Saint-Roch-de-l'Achigan and as a commissioner for the summary trial of minor causes. He did not run for reelection to the assembly in 1814.

References 
 

1765 births
1851 deaths
Members of the Legislative Assembly of Lower Canada
People from Lanaudière